Argyresthia pruniella, the cherry fruit moth or cherry blossom tineid,  is a moth from the family Yponomeutidae, the ermine moths.

Description
Forewings are reddish-brown with a white dorsal stripe and a dark transversal brown stripe in the middle. Antennae are white with brown bands. Along the forewings lower edge there is a row of white spots. Hindwings are brownish and very narrow, with very long fringes. The caterpillars are pale green with a brown head.

Biology
Larvae are oligophagous. Main host plants are apple, apricot, cherry, peach, plum, pear and hazel. The larva lives in the shoots. The flight time ranges from early July to late August. These moths are attracted to light. They are considered a pest of the cultures of said plants.

Distribution
This species can be found in most of Europe, in Asia Minor and in North America.

Gallery

References

External links
 Lepiforum.de
 Lepidoptera of Belgium

Argyresthia
Moths described in 1759
Moths of Europe
Moths of Asia
Moths of North America
Taxa named by Carl Alexander Clerck